Adenta Municipal District is one of the twenty-nine districts in Greater Accra Region, Ghana.  Originally it was formerly part of the then-larger Tema Municipal District, which was created from the former Tema District Council, until two parts of the district were later split off to create Adenta Municipal District (from the northwest part) and Ashaiman Municipal District (from the north central part) respectively on 29 February 2008; thus the remaining part was elevated to metropolitan district assembly status on that same year to become Tema Metropolitan District. The municipality is located in the central part of Greater Accra Region and has Adenta East as its capital town.

Geography
The district is bordered to the north by La Nkwantanang Madina Municipal District, to the east by Kpone Katamanso Municipal District and Tema Metropolitan District, to the south by Ledzokuku Municipal District and Krowor Municipal District, and to the west by Accra Metropolis District.

Population
The total area of the district is 92.84 square kilometers. According to the 2010 census, the population of the district is 78,215 with 39,366 males and 38,849 females. The current population based Ghana Statistical Service record is 96,478.

Sources
 
 GhanaDistricts.com

References

Districts of Greater Accra Region

2008 establishments in Ghana